Lwiza Msyani John (born December 19, 1980 in Dar-es-Salaam) is a Tanzanian athlete who mainly competes in the 800 metres. Her personal best is 1:59.58 minutes, achieved in 2000.

Achievements 
2003 Afro-Asian Games - gold medal
2003 All-Africa Games - bronze medal
2003 East African Championships - gold medal
2001 East African Championships - gold medal
2001 East African Championships - gold medal (200 metres)
2001 IAAF World Indoor Championships - fourth place

External links

1980 births
Living people
Tanzanian female middle-distance runners
People from Dar es Salaam
Athletes (track and field) at the 1998 Commonwealth Games
Athletes (track and field) at the 2002 Commonwealth Games
Athletes (track and field) at the 2006 Commonwealth Games
Commonwealth Games competitors for Tanzania
African Games bronze medalists for Tanzania
African Games medalists in athletics (track and field)
Athletes (track and field) at the 2003 All-Africa Games